Eilean Sùbhainn is the largest of several small islands in Loch Maree, Wester Ross, Scotland. It is the second largest freshwater island in Scotland after Inchmurrin.

The island is a nature reserve and includes several small lochans.

Footnotes

Islands of Loch Maree
Uninhabited islands of Highland (council area)